An architectural historian is a person who studies and writes about the history of architecture, and is regarded as an authority on it.

Professional requirements
As many architectural historians are employed at universities and other facilities for post-secondary education, in addition to bachelor's degree, it is normal for colleges and universities to require the PhD degree for new full-time hires and a master's degree for part-timers.

United States
According to Secretary of the Interior's Guidelines the minimum professional qualifications in architectural history are a graduate degree in architectural history, art history, historic preservation, or closely related field, with coursework in American architectural history, or a bachelor's degree in architectural history, art history, historic preservation or closely related field plus one of the following:

 At least two years of full-time experience in research, writing, or teaching in American architectural history or restoration architecture with an academic institution, historical organization or agency, museum, or other professional institution; or
 Substantial contribution through research and publication to the body of scholarly knowledge in the field of American architectural history.

Profession
Professional architectural historians typically work in colleges and universities, archival centers, government agencies, museums, and as freelance writers and consultants. In broad terms, they can be grouped into following two categories:

Academic titles
Common titles and job descriptions within  Universities and research organizations might be as follows:
 Research Coordinator
 Professor in Architectural History
 Senior Lecturer in Architectural History
 Lecturer in Architectural History
 Researcher in Architectural History
 Research Associate in Architectural History
 Research Assistant in Architectural History

Non-academic titles
Most non-academic positions in architectural history can be grouped into one of the following five categories...
 Preservation Planning and Administration
 This employment category is similar to Main Street management listed below and is interrelated with the following historical research and evaluation category. Professionals in the present field are primarily concerned with the planning and administration of preservation programs, providing technical support to the community and attending public meetings. Positions in this category are typically more office based and require more interpersonal skills than the following category.
 Principal employers are state and local government agencies, including historic preservation offices and nonprofit organizations.
 Historical Research and Evaluation
 This field is the counterpart to preservation planning and administration, above. It involves completing field surveys, conducting research and completing the reports reviewed by state and local government agencies. Compared to preservation planning and administration this field is less office oriented, requiring more on-site work and travel.
 Principal employers are architectural firms, cultural resource firms and government agencies.
 Historic Site Management and Curatorship
 This field is analogous with museum curatorship but often includes aspects of historical research and evaluation, above and/or historic foundation management and administration, below.
 Principal employers are local governments or private, nonprofit organizations.
 Historic Foundation Management and Administration
 Positions in this field are rarely entry level and generally require experience in nonprofit organization administration coupled with a background in architectural history. In many cases duties include those of historic site management as well.
 Principal employers are historic foundations.
 Main Street Management
 Professionals in this field implement and manage downtown revitalization and preservation programs known as Main Street programs. These programs are assisted by the National Trust for Historic Preservation, National Main Street Center. In addition to sharing many of the activities in the preservation planning and administration category, Main Street managers are also involved with marketing and fundraising.
 Principal employers are nonprofit organizations.

Professional organizations
 Society of Architectural Historians
 Society for the Study of Architecture in Canada 
 The Society of Architectural Historians of Great Britain
 The Society of Architectural Historians, Australia and New Zealand

Salaries
Following are averages of salary ranges as listed in position announcements, excluding additional benefits. The upper salary level listed in such announcements may represent qualifications exceeding the minimum requirements specified for the position.

United States
According to a survey conducted by the architectural history department, Savannah College of Art and Design, on professional career opportunities in architectural history, was compiled in January 2010 from positions listed January–December 2009, averages of salary ranges in United States are below.

Positions requiring:
  a B.A. in architectural history or a related field and minimal experience: $30,000-$38,500
 an M.A. or a B.A. plus two years of relevant experience, M.A. frequently preferred. Most positions specify an additional two to three years of experience: $40,500-$55,000.
 or preferring an M.A. with a minimum of three to five years of experience: $48,500-$71,000.
 an advanced degree and more than five years of experience: $61,500- $79,000.

See also

 History of architecture
 List of architectural historians
 List of historians

References

 
Humanities occupations